The Sea II is an album by Norwegian pianist Ketil Bjørnstad recorded in 1996 and released on the ECM label. The album is a sequel to Bjørnstad's 1995 release The Sea.

Reception
The Allmusic review by Scott Yanow awarded the album 4 stars stating "The general mood is a bit sleepy and the development from song to song is quite slow, although there are a few fiery and rockish solos from guitarist Rypdal. But overall, there is little on this well-played set that rises above the level of stimulating background music".

Track listing
ECM – ECM 1633. All compositions by Ketil Bjørnstad except as indicated.

Personnel
Ketil Bjørnstad: piano
Terje Rypdal: guitar
David Darling: cello
Jon Christensen: drums

References

1995 albums
ECM Records albums
Ketil Bjørnstad albums
Albums produced by Manfred Eicher